Bicholim Assembly constituency is one of the 40 Legislative Assembly constituencies of Goa state in India. Bicholim is also one of the 20 constituencies falling under the North Goa Lok Sabha constituency.

It is part of North Goa district.

Members of the Legislative Assembly

Election results

2022 

 : AAP is supporting the independent candidate Chandrakant Setye.

2017 result

2012 result

References

External links
 

North Goa district
Assembly constituencies of Goa